Ambouli is a southern suburb of Djibouti, Djibouti.

Overview
Located in the Djibouti region, O.G.S. Crawford identifies the city with Canbala. Canbala appears in Muhammad al-Idrisi's map of 1192 on the coast of the Horn of Africa, southeast of the straits of Bab-el-Mandeb, and with Cambaleh, a town where the Venetian traveler Bragadino, a thirteenth-century European visitor to Ethiopia, resided for eight years.

Transportation
Since 1948 the town has been the site of Djibouti–Ambouli International Airport.

Notes

References
Ambouli, Djibouti

Populated places in Djibouti